|-
|  
|  
|  
|  
|  
|  
|  

After the creation of bitcoin, the number of new cryptocurrencies expanded quite rapidly.

Active currencies by date of introduction

Inactive currencies

See also 
List of digital currencies

Notes

References